Pinki Buli or Pinky Buly is a Bengali drama directed by Meghnad Bhattacharya. This a production of Bengali theatre group Sayak. The drama explores the complex relation between a master and a servant.

Plot 
Pinki is a city teenage girl and Buli is a village girl. Parents of Pinki appoints Buli as a domestic helper-cum-babysitter for Pinki's months-old brother Bumba. The two characters are poles apart from each other and the drama explores the relation between them. Despite their cultural and social differences they become friends.

Cast 
 Rimi Saha as Pinki
 Bhaswati Chakraborty as Buli
 Runa Mukherjee as Pinki's mother
 Meghnad Bhattacharya as the old man

References

External links 
 Pinki Buli in Sayak's official website

Bengali-language plays
Indian plays